Tharuka Raveen (born 7 April 1997) is a Sri Lankan cricketer. He made his first-class debut for Tamil Union Cricket and Athletic Club in the 2016–17 Premier League Tournament on 15 December 2016.

References

External links
 

1997 births
Living people
Sri Lankan cricketers
Tamil Union Cricket and Athletic Club cricketers
Cricketers from Colombo